Amavas is a 2019 Indian Hindi-language horror thriller film directed by Bhushan Patel. Presented by Viiking Media Entertainment, the film stars Sachiin Joshi, Nargis Fakhri and Mona Singh. The movie was released on 8 February 2019.

Plot
The story is about Karan who is possessed by the spirit of his friend Sameer, who gets murdered. After that, Maya also gets murdered by Sameer's spirit in the body of Karan. So Sameer's spirit killed Gotti, Shibani, Ruhi (Maya's sister), and also tries to kill Ahana. But Karan saves her by killing himself in the burning grave of Sameer. Karan has an injury mark on his chest given by Sameer during his death, his (spirit) only source to survive in the body of Karan. But in the end scene, it seems that there was also same kind of injury mark in the hand of Ahana. So the spirit then also exists in Ahana with the mark of the ghost Movie ends promising a sequel.

Cast
Sachiin Joshi as Karan Ajmera
Nargis Fakhri as Ahana
Vivan Bhatena as Sameer, the ghost
Mona Singh as Dr. Shibani Roy, psychiatrist
Ali Asgar as Gotti, servant and butler
Navneet Kaur Dhillon as Maya
Sabina Chema as Ruhi (Maya's Sister)
Monisha Haseen
Tara Devani
David Broughton as Doctor

Soundtrack 

The film's soundtrack was composed by Sanjeev-Darshan, Ankit Tiwari, Abhijit Vaghani and Asad Khan, with lyrics written by Sandeep Nath, Junaid Wasi, Anurag Bhomia, Kunaal Verma and Ikka. The first song was titled "Jab Se Mera Dil" and released on 11 December 2018. The album is presented by T-Series.

Release 
On 5 January 2019, a new poster was unveiled, which revealed that the release date was postponed to 8 February that year.

Reception

Critical response
Amavas received mixed reviews from critics. Reza Noorani of The Times of India rates the film one and half stars out of five and writes, "As far as the horror is concerned, there is nothing to worry about because the ghost is extremely predictable even when it tries to surprise you. While the effects are slick and the ghosts match up to international standards, they cannot save this film from turning into a painful two-hour-long watch". In contrast, Subhash K. Jha of News18 gave it three stars out of five and opined: "Death is indeed a "grave" matter in Hindi horror, what with the graveyard being a favourite haunt of horror. Amavas doesn't visit any graveyard but a grave plays an important part in the rites of exorcism. The film presses all the right buttons, ticks all the boxes". Kunal Guha of Mumbai Mirror, however, rated the film one star out of five, and felt it "reduces horror to hilarity".

Box office
The film earned 0.75 crore nett in India on its opening day. Amavas has collected 30 million nett pan India in its opening week.

References

External links

2019 horror thriller films
Indian horror thriller films
2010s Hindi-language films
Films scored by Sanjeev Darshan
Films scored by Ankit Tiwari
Films scored by Asad Khan
Films scored by Abhijit Vaghani
Films shot in Venice
Indian remakes of American films
Indian horror film remakes
2019 films